Edward Shaw Richardson (1862 – 15 November 1921) was Archdeacon of Blackburn from 1920 to 1921.

He was educated at Rossall School and Trinity College, Cambridge and ordained in 1867. He began his ecclesiastical career with curacies in Poulton-le-Fylde, Corbridge, Kersal and Ancoats. He was then successively Rector of St Paul's, Hulme; Vicar of St Matthew's, Bolton; Rector  of St George's, Hulme; and a  Canon Residentiary of Manchesterbefore his Archdeacon’s appointment.

He died on 15 November 1921.

References

1862 births
1921 deaths
People educated at Rossall School
Alumni of Trinity College, Cambridge
Archdeacons of Blackburn